Lady Elizabeth Montagu, known as Betty Montagu, (4 July 1917 – 10 January 2006) was a British novelist, nurse, and art collector. The daughter of the 9th Earl of Sandwich and the American heiress Alberta Sturges, she grew up at Hinchingbrooke House in Huntingdon and was educated at North Foreland Lodge. A prominent debutante in the 1930s, she was active in the London Season before World War II. When war broke out in Europe, she volunteered as a nurse, heading the casualties department at St. Thomas' Hospital in London. After the war ended, she served on the teaching staff at the Royal College of Nursing until 1950.

In the 1950s and 1960s, Lady Elizabeth was a celebrated novelist. She published three novels through Heinemann, Waiting for Camilla in 1953, The Small Corner in 1955, and This Side of the Truth in 1947. In 1958 she published an English translation of Carl Zuckmayer's 1955 drama Das kalte Licht. Lady Elizabeth also wrote contributing pieces for various British magazines, including Encounter. Her final work, a collection of short stories titled Change, and Other Stories, was published in 1966. She succumbed to alcoholism and never wrote again. Her work was praised by Sir John Betjeman, John Davenport, and Graham Greene and she received glowing reviews in The Times Literary Supplement and the New Statesman.

Lady Elizabeth was also an amateur artist who painted country scenes and drew portraits of her friends. She was an avid art collector and, along with maintaining a large art collection she inherited from her father, she collected works by Graham Sutherland, Sir Sidney Nolan, Frank Auerbach, and Michael Andrews.

Early life and family 
Lady Elizabeth Montagu was born on 4 July 1917 in London, the youngest child of George Montagu, 9th Earl of Sandwich and Alberta Montagu, Countess of Sandwich. She was a younger sister of Victor Montagu, 10th Earl of Sandwich, The Honourable William Drogo Sturges Montagu, and Lady Mary Faith Montagu. Her paternal grandfather, Rear Admiral The Honourable Victor Montagu, was an officer in the Royal Navy and a godson of Queen Victoria. Her paternal great-grandfather was Charles Yorke, 4th Earl of Hardwicke. On her mother's side, Lady Elizabeth was the granddaughter of Betty Leggett and a descendent of the American judge Jonathan Sturges. She was a grandniece of Josephine MacLeod, who, like her mother and grandmother, was a devotee of the Hindu monk and philosopher Swami Vivekananda.

Lady Elizabeth grew up at Hinchingbrooke House, the family's ancestral seat in Huntingdon. She was educated at North Foreland Lodge, a boarding school for girls in North Foreland, and went on to study German language in Munich. She was presented as a debutante in the 1930s and was a model for Pond's cold cream advertisements.

Career

Nursing 
During World War II, Lady Elizabeth volunteered as a nurse and was head of casualties at St Thomas' Hospital in London. Sir John Rupert Colville wrote in his diaries that, while off-duty from hospital work, Lady Elizabeth "talked a lot of nonsense about religion and the ineffectiveness of our propaganda in America." She and Colville took shelter during The Blitz in September 1940, when they were lunching in Hyde Park and "shells burst over" their heads. Lady Elizabeth worked at St. Thomas' Hospital until 1946, and was on the teaching staff of the Royal College of Nursing from 1947 to 1950.

Writing 
She was an acclaimed novelist, and wrote Waiting for Camilla in 1953, The Small Corner in 1955, and This Side of the Truth in 1957. In 1966 she published Change, and Other Stories. Her novels were all published by Heinemann. The English poet Sir John Betjeman called her novel The Small Corner a "clever and subtle novel". English critic and book reviewer John Davenport called the novel "strangely compelling... a study of a woman who is self-righteous to the point of mania." The writer Graham Greene said Lady Elizabeth "does a very difficult thing, triumphantly" in her writing of This Side of the Truth and that she "writes with cool detachment, pinning down futility with the point of an acid pen" in Waiting for Camilla. As well as a novelist, Lady Elizabeth was a contributor to various magazines including Encounter. In 1958 she translated Carl Zuckmayer's 1955 drama Das kalte Licht (The Cold Night) from German to English. Her works were praised by The Times Literary Supplement and the New Statesman. She would write while staying in a cottage in Dorset next to an apple orchard.

Personal life 
Lady Elizabeth was an art collector, collecting works by Graham Sutherland, Sir Sidney Nolan, Frank Auerbach, and Michael Andrews. She inherited a large collection of paintings and other art objects from her father's collection, and also was an amateur painter herself, painting country scenery and sketching portraits of her friends.

She described herself as a socialist and as an agnostic, but remained politically neutral if not conservative in practice. She never married, and built a house in the South of France with her friend Anne Balfour-Fraser. An alcoholic, she went to live with the shipping heiress Charlie Delmas in Mougins while she recovered.

Lady Elizabeth owned a flat in Battersea, where she spent the last years of her life. She died in London on 10 January 2006.

References 

1917 births
2006 deaths
20th-century English women writers
Art collectors from London
British debutantes
British people of American descent
British women in World War II
British women nurses
Daughters of British earls
English agnostics
English female models
English socialists
English women novelists
Female wartime nurses
Elizabeth
Nurses from London
People educated at North Foreland Lodge
Royal College of Nursing
Socialites from London
Women art collectors